Ethiopian Railway, commonly known as ER, full name Ethiopian Railway Corporation, is the national railway operator of the Federal Democratic Republic of Ethiopia, under the regulation of the Ministry of Transport. ERC operates passenger and freight transport. Founded on 28 November 2007 (regulation 141/2007) as a quasi-public corporation to operate Ethiopia's passenger and freight rail services, mainly the Addis Ababa–Djibouti Railway, it receives federal subsidies but is managed as a for-profit organization. ERC's headquarters is located in Addis Ababa.

The corporation is building a railway school in Bishoftu in partnership with the Chinese government at a cost of 1.57 billion birr.

References 

Government-owned railway companies
Government-owned companies of Ethiopia
Railway companies of Ethiopia
Railway companies established in 2007
2007 establishments in Ethiopia
Companies based in Addis Ababa